Donna Strauss (born August 12, 1942) is an American gymnastics coach and the co-founder and proprietor of the Parkettes National Gymnastics Training Center in Allentown, Pennsylvania, which she founded with her husband Bill in the 1960s.

References 

1942 births
Living people
American gymnastics coaches
Sportspeople from Allentown, Pennsylvania